The Trade Union Congress of Nigeria (TUC) is a national trade union federation in Nigeria, focusing on unions representing senior staff.

History
In 1978, trade unions in Nigeria were restructured into 42 industrial unions, and 19 unions representing senior staff.  The Nigeria Labour Congress was established to represent the industrial unions.  The senior staff unions attempt to found the Federation of Senior Staff Associations of Nigeria, but the government refused to recognise the body.  In 1986, it permitted the formation of a loose, consultative body, the Senior Staff Consultative Association of Nigeria (SECSCAN).

In 2005, the law was changed, permitting the formation of multiple national trade union federations, and for senior staff unions to join any federation of their choosing.  SECSCAN was dissolved, with most of its affiliates forming a new Trade Union Congress of Nigeria.  Soon after, it was a founding affiliate of the International Trade Union Confederation.

Together with the Nigeria Labour Congress, the federation supported Peter Obi and the Labour Party in the 2023 Nigerian general election, the first time both organisations explicitly support a political party.

Affiliates
As of 2020, the federation has 29 affiliates:

Leadership

Presidents
2005: Peace Obiajulu
2007: Peter Esele
2013: Bobboi Bala Kaigama
2019: Quadri A. Olaleye

General Secretaries
2005: John Kolawole
2012: Musa-Lawal Ozigi
2022: Nuhu Toro

External links

References

Trade unions in Nigeria
Trade unions established in 2005